Charles Richard Newman (born January 16, 1967) is an American record producer, recording engineer, composer, songwriter, multi-instrumentalist, talent manager and music publisher. He is the co-founder of New York City's Mother West Records and Studios, The Deli Magazine, and the band PLEASE, who enjoyed minor success when their single "Here It Comes Again" was featured on the soundtrack to the film Empire Records. Most notably he has been working as the main engineer, mixer and co-producer for Stephin Merritt and The Magnetic Fields since his initial work on the critically acclaimed 69 Love Songs. He has also produced, mixed and engineered work by artists such as Flare, Gospel Music, Tom Shaner, Jon DeRosa, Dylan Trees, The Davenports, Lauren Molina, Soko, The Bones of J.R. Jones, Aloud, and, Peppina. Newman began co-managing the Seattle based rock band Motopony in 2015 accompanying the band on their tour of the United Kingdom, and assisting in production on their live EP “Naked at the Abbey” with producer Rob Cass.

Record credits

References

External links
Mother West Newman's Studio in New York.
Cottage Sounds Newman's studio in Los Angeles.
The Vault Mother West's catalog of songs.
The Deli Magazine Deli Magazine's homepage.

1967 births
Living people
American audio engineers
Record producers from Maryland
Businesspeople from Baltimore